Gustav Alexander Max Uth (24 November 1863 in Berlin – 15 June 1914 in Hermannswerder, Potsdam) was a German painter of landscapes and art teacher.

Uth was the son of a manufacturer and enrolled at the Academy of Art in Berlin under Eugen Bracht. He opened his own atelier for women painters in 1897 in Berlin; among his students were Gertrud Berger (1870–1949), Laura Schaberg (1860 or 1866–1935), Sophie Wencke-Meinken (1874–1963) and Emmy Gotzmann (1881-1950).

Paintings by him were among those exhibited in the AEG electricity pavilion at the Paris Exposition Universelle in 1900 and in the German Pavilion at the St. Louis World's Fair in 1904. He was one of the founding members of the Berlin Secession in 1899, and one of the sixteen artists to leave it in 1902.

Notable works
 Am Bach. Sommerliche Stimmung, am Ufer eines Baches steht ein Angler. (n.d.; oil on canvas; 70 x 70 cm)
 Landsitz in der Mark. (ca. 1900; oil on canvas; 88 x 99 cm) 
 Der Biergarten. (ca. 1910; oil on canvas; 75,5 x 85 cm) 
 Dünenlandschaft. (oil on canvas; 40 x 54 cm)

References

External links

 

1863 births
1914 deaths
19th-century German painters
19th-century German male artists
German male painters
Artists from Berlin